One in a Million is the second studio album by Norwegian DJ and record producer Matoma. It was released on 24 August 2018 via Parlophone and Warner Music Group. It was preceded by three singles: "Slow" (featuring Noah Cyrus), "Lonely" (featuring Max) and "I Don't Dance (Without You)" (a collaboration with Enrique Iglesias and featuring Konshens). It also includes the 2016 singles "False Alarm", a collaboration with British singer Becky Hill that was previously included on Matoma's debut album Hakuna Matoma, and "All Night", a collaboration with British boy band The Vamps that was included on the "Night Edition" of their 2017 album Night & Day.

One in a Million debuted at number 12 in Norway and 17 on the US Dance/Electronic Albums chart.

Music
The album includes 15 songs broadly categorised as dance-pop with a tropical influence. Billboard magazine mentioned its potential crossover pop appeal due to its "stirringly emotional moments and dance floor feelings". Earmilk also noted the album's Latin influence due to collaborations with Enrique Iglesias and Yashua. Dancing Astronaut called attention to Matoma's "sun drenched style" on the album and its changes in tempo, with "Slow" being "tamer" while tracks like "Sunday Morning" are "high energy".

In a track-by-track rundown of the album, Matoma explained that he decided to include "False Alarm" again because "the story behind the song and how much it has meant to me deserves a place on this album".

Track listing

Charts

References

2018 albums
Matoma albums
Albums produced by MNEK
Albums produced by TMS (production team)